The Wuling Victory is a car produced by SAIC-GM-Wuling through the Wuling brand. It is a mid-size multi-purpose vehicle (MPV) with standard three-row seating.

Overview 
The Victory debuted at the 2020 Chengdu Motor Show as the first global model sold under the Wuling brand. The Victory is the first model to wear the updated Wuling global's silver logo, and one of the pre-production unit of the vehicle is also the 22 millionth vehicle to roll off the SAIC-GM-Wuling's assembly lines.

Specifications 
Mated to either a six-speed manual or a continuously variable transmission with eight pre-programmed gear ratios  while the hybrid is mated with Intelligent DHT transmission.

In China, the Victory is offered in Elite, Noble, and Flagship grade levels.

References

External links 

  (in Chinese)

Victory
Cars introduced in 2020
Minivans
Front-wheel-drive vehicles
Vehicles with CVT transmission
Cars of China